Saxidomus, common name the "Washington clams", is a genus of large edible saltwater clams, marine bivalve mollusks in the family Veneridae, the Venus clams.

The species Saxidomus gigantea is known as the "butter clam".

The term for saxitoxin (the neurotoxin found in paralytic shellfish poisoning) is derived from the genus name Saxidomus.

Species
Species within the genus Saxidomus include:

References

 
Bivalve genera